Gorentla is a village located in Nuthankal, Nalgonda district, Andhra Pradesh. It had a population of 3,899 across 1,018 households in the 2011 Census of India.

References

Villages in Suryapet district